This is a bibliography on the Kent State shootings.  External links to reports, news articles and other sources of information may also be found below.

Books
 Agte, Barbara Becker, (2012), Kent Letters: Students' Responses to the May 1970 Massacre. Deming, New Mexico: Bluewaters Press 
 Caputo, Philip. (2005). 13 Seconds: A Look Back at the Kent State Shootings with DVD. New York: Chamberlain Bros. .
 Davies, Peter and the Board of Church and Society of the United Methodist Church. (1973). The Truth About Kent State: A Challenge to the American Conscience. New York: Farrar, Straus & Giroux. .
 Eszterhas, Joe, and Michael D. Roberts (1970). Thirteen Seconds: Confrontation at Kent State. New York: Dodd, Mead. .
 Gordon, William A. (1990). The Fourth of May: Killings and Coverups at Kent State. Buffalo, NY: Prometheus Books. . Updated and reprinted in 1995 as Four Dead in Ohio: Was There a Conspiracy at Kent State? Laguna Hills, California: North Ridge Books. .
 Giles, Robert (2020). When Truth Mattered: The Kent State Shootings 50 Years Later. Traverse City, MI: Mission Point Press. 
 Grace, Thomas M. (2016). Kent State: Death and Dissent in the Long Sixties. Amherst, MA: University of Massachusetts Press. .
 Hensley,Thomas R. and Jerry M. Lewis (2010), Kent State and May 4th A Social Science Perspective 3rd Edition. Kent, Ohio: The Kent State University Press.   
 Kelner, Joseph and James Munves, The Kent State Coverup, New York: Harper & Row. .
 Means, Howard. (2016). 67 Shots: Kent State and the End of American Innocence. Boston: Da Capo Press. .
 Michener, James. (1971). Kent State: What Happened and Why. New York: Random House and Reader's Digest Books. .
 Payne, J. Gregory/. (1981). Mayday: Kent State. Dubuque, IA: Kendall/Hunt Pub. Co. .
 Ruffner, Howard. (2019). Moments of Truth - A Photographer's Experience at Kent State 1970. Kent, OH: The Kent State University Press. 
 Simpson, Craig S., and Gregory S. Wilson. (2016). Above the Shots: An Oral History of the Kent State Shootings. Kent, OH: The Kent State University Press. .
 Stone, I. F. (1970). The Killings at Kent State: How Murder Went Unpunished, in series, New York Review Book[s]. New York: distributed by Vintage Books. N.B.: The second printing also includes copyrighted material dated 1971. .
 Weissman, Norman. (2008). Snapshots USA. Mystic, Connecticut: Hammonasset House Books. .

Articles
 Listman, John W. Jr. "Kent's Other Casualties", National Guard magazine, May 2000.
 Stone, I. F. "Fabricated Evidence in the Kent State Killings", The New York Review of Books, Volume 15, Number December 10, 3 1970.
 WKSU News: Newly-Enhanced Audio Tape May Reveal Order to Fire on Kent State Students, Former Student Who Was Shot Calling for Investigation, Tuesday, May 1, 2007 – with audio links
 Remembering Kent State shooting victims By Jim Mackinnon, Akron Beacon Journal writer, May 5, 2008 – Scott Ritter speaks at 2008 commemoration
 Newspaper article archives:
 Kent State tragedy: Reflecting on May 4, 1970 (the Akron Beacon Journal)
 Kent State Shootings 40th Anniversary (The Plain Dealer of Cleveland)

Films

 1970: Confrontation at Kent State (director Richard Myers) – documentary filmed by a Kent State University filmmaker in Kent, Ohio, directly following the shootings.
 1981: Kent State (director James Goldstone) – television docudrama.
 2000: Kent State: The Day the War Came Home (director Chris Triffo, executive producer Mark Mori), the Emmy-Award-winning documentary featuring interviews with injured students, eyewitnesses, guardsmen, and relatives of students killed at Kent State.
 2007: 4 Tote in Ohio: Ein Amerikanisches Trauma ("4 dead in Ohio: an American trauma") (directors Klaus Bredenbrock and Pagonis Pagonakis) – documentary featuring interviews with injured students, eyewitnesses and a German journalist who was a U.S. correspondent.
 2008: How It Was: Kent State Shootings – National Geographic Channel documentary series episode.
 2010: Fire In the Heartland: Kent State, May 4, and Student Protest in America (director Daniel Lee Miller) – documentary featuring the build-up to, the events of, and the aftermath of the shootings, told by many of those who were present and in some cases wounded.

Reports
 Report of the President's Commission on Campus Unrest ("Scranton Commission"). (1970) Washington, D.C.: U.S. Government Printing Office. .

Websites
 Kent State University May 4, 1970 Resource Page
 Kent State University May 4, 1970, Online Newsroom
 Kent State University 40 May 4 Commemoration Events Listing – 2010 anniversary events at KSU
 Kent State University, Department of Special Collections & Archives: May 4 Collection
 May 4 Task Force home page
 May 4 Shootings at Kent State University: The Search for Historical Accuracy By Jerry M. Lewis and Thomas R. Hensley (KSU professors)
 Vietnam War Song Project: Kent State Songs By Justin Brummer (UCL)
 May4Archive.org (maintained by Kent State historian Dr. J. Gregory Payne)
 FBI file on the Kent State shootings
 Tom Grace eyewitness account
 Eyewitness: Howard Ruffner
 Repository of Oral Histories of the Kent State Shootings
 Kent State shooting scrapbook
 Links, photos, music and eyewitness reports about the shootings at Kent State.
 AlanCanfora.com – personal website of one of the survivors; historical information, photographs, & commentary.
 May4.Org – A 501(c)(3) non-profit educational charity about the Kent State Shootings.
 Kent State Remembered – A collection of articles regarding the Kent State Protest.
 Mike and Kendra's Kent State, May 4, 1970 web site – Detailing the commemoration process and related controversies and providing sources for research.
 Kent State 1970: Information Repository by WKSU
National Register nomination form

Audio
 "Sound Montage On Kent State", Morning Edition, NPR, 5/4/2000 (sound montage from NPR)

Video
 Dean Kahler on KSU's May 4 Visitors' Center - short interview with Dean Kahler.
 On 40th Anniversary of Kent State Shootings, Truth Tribunal Seeks Answers – video report by Democracy Now!
 Death at Kent State, Nat Geo Online

References

Kent State shootings
Kent State shootings